The list of governments of the Lao People's Democratic Republic, commonly abbreviated to Lao Government, is the main executive institution of government. It is led by the Prime Minister, the country's head of government. The Prime Minister is nominated by the President at a plenary session of the National Assembly, the country's legislature. The term of a government follows that of the elected legislature.

Governments

See also 
 Prime Minister of Laos
 Government of Laos

External links 

 
1975 establishments in Laos